HAC may refer to:

Arts
 Harrow Arts Centre, London, England
 Humboldt Arts Council

Government
 Hakka Affairs Council, of the Republic of China
 House Appropriations Committee, a committee of the United States House of Representatives

Organisations
 Hadassah Academic College, Jerusalem, Israel
 Hague Academic Coalition
 Honourable Artillery Company, a British Army unit and a charitable organisation
 Higher Attestation Commission, a national government agency in Russia, Ukraine and some other post-Soviet states that oversees awarding of advanced academic degrees
 Humanist Association of Canada
 Sudan Humanitarian Aid Commission
 H.A.C. Inc., parent company of the Homeland chain of supermarkets in the U.S. state of Oklahoma.
 The High Ambition Coalition (HAC) is an informal group of approximately 61 countries within the UN Framework Convention on Climate Change (UNFCCC)

Science and engineering
 Acetic acid (HAc)
 High acid crude oil, a crude oil with a high concentration of naphthenic acids
 High Alumina Cement (HAC), now known generally as Calcium aluminate cements
 Human artificial chromosome
 Newey–West HAC estimator
 Hierarchical agglomerative clustering, a type of hierarchical clustering
 Lucile Hac (1909–2006), American biochemist and microbiologist

Sport
 Hoosier Athletic Conference
 Hóquei Académico de Cambra, a Portuguese rink hockey club
 Le Havre Athletic Club, a French football club
 Horoya AC, a Guinean football club
 Hydra AC, an Algerian football club

Transport
 Hachijojima Airport, in the Izu Islands, Japan
 Hackney Downs railway station, in London
 Hokkaido Air System
 Hrvatske autoceste, a Croatian motorway operator
 Hughes Aircraft Company

Other uses
 Gorani language (ISO 639-3: hac)
 Hectare
 High-availability cluster
 Honorary Air Commodore
 Hospital-acquired condition
 Hot Action Cop, an American band
 Hot adult contemporary, a radio format
 Hyles–Anderson College
 HAC, a product code prefix used for the Nintendo Switch, its software, and accessories

See also 
 Hack (disambiguation)